The scientific name Diplotaxis may refer to:

 Diplotaxis (beetle), a genus of scarab beetle
 Diplotaxis (plant), a genus of crucifer